Elections to West Lindsey District Council were held on 1 May 2003. One third of the council was up for election and the council stayed under no overall control.

After the election, the composition of the council was:
 Conservative 17
 Liberal Democrat 13
 Independent 6
 Labour 1

Election result

One Conservative candidate was unopposed.

Ward results

References
 2003 West Lindsey election result
 Ward results

2003 English local elections
2003
2000s in Lincolnshire